Milyonaryong Mini   is a Cebuano language sitcom about mistaken identity. It shows the Philippines' social classes between the rich and the poor. The original version was first aired from 1995-1996 and the remake was aired ten years later in 2006.

Synopsis 
Berting (2006:Randolph Libres, original cast 1995: Dr Charles Ivan Nadela)   is a rich guy and his friend Cosme (Budoy Marabiles) is a poor man. Both guys come from the big City and goes back to the province. Berting has a crush on a certain girl, Salud (Cathy Gabronino) who does not entertain rich guys. Salud's sister, Petra (Cherry Lou) on the other hand loves rich guys. So the perfect switch happens when Berting tells Cosme to pretend to be a rich guy, and Berting will pretend to be a poor guy. All goes well at first in getting the girl of Berting's dreams until one day they find out the truth.

Cast 
 2006:Randolph Libres 1995: original version: Dr. Charles Ivan Nadela- as Berting
 Cathy Gabronino as Salud
 Budoy Marabiles as Cosme
 Cherry Lou as Petra

References

ABS-CBN Regional shows
Philippine comedy television series
2006 Philippine television series debuts
2007 Philippine television series endings
Television in Cebu City